Twante Township also Twantay Township is a township in the Yangon Region of Burma (Myanmar). It is located west across the Hlaing River from the city of Yangon. The principal town and administrative seat is Twante. The township is home to the Shwesandaw Pagoda (known as "Golden Hair Relic Pagoda" in English) and it is believed to contain strands of hair from the head of Gautama, and its annual pagoda festival is held on Burmese New Year. Built by the British in 1881, the Twante Canal The longest man made canal in Myanmar is Twante canal is the longest man-made canal in Myanmar, providing a shortcut waterway between Irawaddy River and Yangon river. This divides Twante Township across its which divides Twante Township with its length of 35 km and there is one bridge that spans the canal is called Twante bridge. Baungdawgyoke Monastery in Twante Township is famous as there are pagodas including the replica of Mahabodhi Temple

History
During the British rule in Burma, George Orwell was a police officer in Twante, responsible for the security of some 200,000 people.

Communities
The 220 villages of Twante Township are organized into 65 village tracts and 8 urban wards. Twante Township is well known for its pottery activities handled by a few families since several generations. It is also area of fish farming in Yangon region.

Transport
A water bus on the river connects with Yangon.

References

External links
  "Twantay Township, Yangon Division" map ID: MIMU154 Twantay Township 090227 v01, February 2009, Myanmar Information Management Unit (MIMU)
 "Disaster Risk Reduction: Twantay Township" 5 July 2010, Myanmar Information Management Unit (MIMU), map showing Village Tracts
 "Twante Google Satellite Map" Maplandia World Gazetteer

Townships of Yangon Region